The Charlie Brown and Snoopy Show  (known as You're on Nickelodeon, Charlie Brown during reruns on Nickelodeon) is an American animated television series featuring characters and storylines from the Charles M. Schulz comic strip Peanuts as first presented for television in the Peanuts animated specials. It aired Saturday mornings on the CBS network from 1983 to 1985.

Due to lower-than-expected ratings, in an attempt to boost viewership, CBS moved the series to 8:00 a.m. Eastern Time early in 1984. It did not help the ratings much, and while the show was not formally cancelled in 1984, further production was on hiatus, and in 1985, CBS ordered five new episodes for what would be a second and final season. Early in 1986, CBS dropped the show after a ratings recession.The Charlie Brown and Snoopy Show is one of the few television series produced by Bill Melendez, whose animation studio generally produced specials.

The show reaired on The Disney Channel in 1993 and was aired on YTV in Canada by 1996. It also aired on the CBBC block on BBC One and BBC Two from 1986 to 2005.

 Voice cast 
Typical for an animated Peanuts production, the characters were performed by real children, and there was a large cast turnover between the first and second season due to many of the child actors maturing out of their roles, leaving only Jeremy Schoenberg, Jason Mendelson and Bill Melendez to remain.

 Season 1 (1983) 
 Brad Kesten as Charlie Brown
Stacy Heather Tolkin as Sally Brown/Truffles
 Cindi Reilly as Sally Brown
Angela Lee Sloan as Lucy van Pelt (Credited As Angela Lee)
Jeremy Schoenberg as Linus van Pelt/Floyd
 Rocky Reilly as Linus van Pelt
Kevin Brando as Schroeder/5/Thibault 
Jason Mendelson as Rerun van Pelt (credited as Jason Muller) 
Victoria Vargas as Peppermint Patty
Michael Dockery as Marcie/Shermy 
Mary Tunnell as Frieda/Eudora 
Bill Melendez as Snoopy/Woodstock

 Season 2 (1985) 
 Brett Johnson as Charlie Brown
 Stacy Ferguson as Sally Brown/Patty
 Heather Stoneman as Lucy van Pelt
 Jeremy Schoenberg as Linus Van Pelt/Harold Angel
 Danny Colby as Schroeder
 Jason Mendelson as Rerun van Pelt (credited as Jason Muller)
 Carl Steven as Franklin/"Pig-Pen"
 Gini Holtzman as Peppermint Patty
 Keri Houlihan as Marcie
 Dana Ferguson as Samantha
 Bill Melendez as Snoopy/Woodstock
Note: Violet, Roy, and other characters make cameo appearances but are silent.

Episodes

Series overview

Season 1 (1983)

Season 2 (1985)

 Theme song 
The first season's theme was a Vince Guaraldi styled piano-based instrumental written and produced for this series, which was composed by Desiree Goyette and Ed Bogas. The song was given lyrics and released in 1984 as "Let's Have a Party with Charlie Brown and Snoopy" on the album Flashbeagle, the soundtrack to the special It's Flashbeagle, Charlie Brown. On the second season, a shortened version with the lyrics that appeared on the Flashbeagle album was used.

The Chinese-Cantonese version and the Japanese version were written by Seeyan Wong, Charles M. Schulz Hong Kong Fan Club in 2019 and 2020 respectively.

Home media
In 1987, Kartes Video Communications released the show on VHS in nine volumes (with titles in the style of normal Peanuts specials), with two episodes each.

From 1994 to 2001, Paramount Home Video released the show on VHS and LaserDisc in the same fashion, but under the actual title of the show.

On June 14, 2011, Warner Home Video released the fourteenth episode of the show on DVD under a single disc called: Happiness Is... Peanuts: Snoopy's Adventures. They also announced that on October 18, 2011, the eighteenth and final episode of the show would come to DVD under a single disc called: Happiness Is... Peanuts: Snow Days, the thirteenth episode of the show came to DVD under a single disc called: Happiness Is... Peanuts: Friends Forever on December 27, 2011, and the fifteenth episode of the show came to DVD under a single disc called: Happiness Is... Peanuts: Team Snoopy on May 1, 2012. On October 9, 2012, Happiness Is... Peanuts: Go Snoopy Go! featured the twelfth episode of the show. Also, the entire series is available through iTunes. On January 21, 2014, the first, fourth and eleventh episodes appeared on a single disc DVD called Touchdown Charlie Brown''.

On November 20, 2012, Warner Bros. released the complete series on DVD in Region 1 via their Warner Archive Collection. Nine episodes are on each of the two disc set.

All episodes have previously been released on DVD in Australia and Germany across two 2-disc box sets.

References

External links 
 

1983 American television series debuts
1985 American television series endings
1980s American animated television series
Television shows based on comic strips
Works based on Peanuts (comic strip)
CBS original programming
English-language television shows
Television series by DHX Media
American children's animated comedy television series
Animated television series about dogs
Animated television series about birds
Animated television series about children